Corydoras agassizii is a species of catfish found in the Amazon basin. It can be found in the border area of Peru and Brazil. It lives in tropical waters with a water temperature of 22 - 26 °C, a pH of 6.0 - 8.0 and a hardness of 2 - 25 dH.

According to FishBase, the fish has a standard length of 5.2 cm. As other members of its genus, it is a bottom-dwelling and shoaling species. It has an omnivorous diet. Breeding occurs similarly to other species. The female holds two to four eggs between her pelvic fins, which are then fertilized by the male. After fertilization, the female deposits the sticky eggs. This process is then repeated until about a 100 eggs are laid. The species can be found in the aquarium trade.

Named in honor of zoologist-geologist Louis Agassiz

See also
 List of freshwater aquarium fish species

References

Corydoras
Taxa named by Franz Steindachner
Fish described in 1876